Markovian Parallax Denigrate is a series of hundreds of messages posted to Usenet in 1996. The messages, which appear to be gibberish, were all posted with the subject line "Markovian parallax denigrate".

The posts are often mentioned in conjunction with other bizarre and/or unsolved internet mysteries, such as Sad Satan, Cicada 3301, the Publius Enigma, and Unfavorable Semicircle. In 2012, Kevin Morris of The Daily Dot referred to the messages as "the Internet’s oldest and weirdest mystery". It has also been described as "one of the first great mysteries of the internet".

In 2016, Susan Lindauer was mistakenly identified as a possible source of these posts; when contacted, she denied being the author. The Daily Dot article covering the event states that an e-mail account belonging to a University of Wisconsin at Stevens Point student coincidentally named Susan Lindauer was spoofed to cover the identity of the poster. Proposed explanations for the texts include an early experimental chat bot or text generator, an internet troll or prankster posting forum spam, or a programmer experimenting with Markov chains. 

A later article on the subject published by The A.V. Club proposes the event only became a mystery due to later media coverage, having not been widely reported prior to the 2012 Daily Dot article. The same article notes that YouTuber Barely Sociable made a video about this topic in 2020, opining that the messages were most likely simple spam with no hidden message.

Example 
This seemingly nonsensical message was posted to the board "alt.religion.christian.boston-church" in 1996:

See also 
List of famous ciphertexts
Numbers station
Webdriver Torso

References 

Usenet
Works of unknown authorship
Internet mysteries
1996 works